The  is a rapid transit electric multiple unit (EMU) train type operated on the Sendai Subway Namboku Line in Sendai, Japan.

The 1000 series was the world's first train type to use fuzzy logic to control its speed, and this system developed by Hitachi accounts for the relative smoothness of the starts and stops when compared to other trains, and is 10% more energy efficient than human-controlled acceleration. It was the recipient of the 28th Laurel Prize award presented by the Japan Railfan Club.

Refurbishment 
From 2004 until 2013, the 1000 series trains underwent mid-life refurbishment to extend their lifespan. As of April 2009, 12 sets have been refurbished, and the refurbished sets are renamed 1000N series.

The refurbished trains include the following features.
 LED destination indicators at the train ends
 Space for wheelchairs 
 Air-conditioning
 LED destination indicators inside trains

See also 
 Sendai Subway 2000 series

References

External links 
 Sendai City Transportation Bureau website

Electric multiple units of Japan
Sendai Subway Namboku Line
Train-related introductions in 1987
Kawasaki multiple units
1500 V DC multiple units of Japan